World of Comedy, also known as Harold Lloyd's World of Comedy, is a 1962 American documentary compilation of scenes from Harold Lloyd's best known films. The clips were personally selected by Lloyd, who also wrote the voiceover narration.

The film marked the return of Lloyd to cinemas after an absence of almost two decades, and it included extended excerpts from the classics Safety Last! and Feet First which had not been publicly screened during the previous three decades.

Reception 
The film was well received by most critics and audiences as a reminder of Lloyd's creative output as the third (with Charlie Chaplin and Buster Keaton) of the "Big 3" great silent comedy filmmakers. It was premiered at the 1962 Cannes Film Festival where it received a standing ovation.

Although enthusiastically well received by audiences with fond memories of Lloyd's films, the reception by younger critics was slightly more reserved. Specific criticisms include the lack of context for some of the clips and closing narration.

See also
 List of American films of 1962
 Harold Lloyd filmography
 Why Worry?
 Girl Shy

References

External links 

 The Harold Lloyd Trust

1962 films
1962 comedy films
American comedy films
American black-and-white films
Compilation films
Films directed by Harold Lloyd
Films scored by Walter Scharf
1960s English-language films
1960s American films